The Birsig is a rather small river in eastern France and northern Switzerland. Its source is in the village Biederthal, in the French Haut-Rhin department, near the Swiss border. It flows variably through Swiss and French territory and through the Birsig Valley. Afterwards it passes the city of Basel, where it enters the Rhine (left bank).

The river Birsig originally flowed openly through Basel, but the river was long ago channelled and its banks built up to prevent water damage to the houses. The river flowed directly along the houses in the lower part of the city, where many bridges were built over. It took the fecal waste from the houses and was therefore called "the city's big cloaca", which favoured the outbreak of cholera and typhus.

Nowadays the Birsig is covered over for most of its course in Basel; there are just a few hundred meters around the city zoo where the Birsig can be seen openly.

References

External links 
Photography of the Birsig kloak

Rivers of Switzerland
Rivers of France
International rivers of Europe
Rivers of Basel-Stadt
Rivers of Grand Est
Rivers of Haut-Rhin